Richard Robert Elliott (October 9, 1879 – November 15, 1951) was an American character actor who appeared in 102 Hollywood films and television shows from 1916 to 1951.

Life and career
He was born Richard Robert Elliott in 1879 in Columbus, Ohio. Most of his main roles were in the silent era, in the sound era he mostly performed in supporting roles and bit parts. On the stage he originated the Sergeant O'Hara character opposite Jeanne Eagels in somerset Maugham's play Rain (1922).

Active in films from 1916, Elliott played Detective Crosby in the 1928 feature Lights of New York, the first all-talking sound film. One of his most notable roles was that of a Yankee officer playing cards with Rhett Butler (Clark Gable) in the film Gone With the Wind. The officer says of Rhett, "It's hard to be strict with a man who loses money so pleasantly."

Personal life
Robert Elliott was married to Ruth Thorp (1889–1971) from 1920 until his death in 1951, aged 72, in Los Angeles, California.

Selected filmography

 The Kiss of Hate (1916) - Sergius Orzoff
 Notorious Gallagher (1916) - Robert Ewing
 The Child of Destiny (1916) - Bob Stange
 Miss Petticoats (1916) - Rev. Ralph Harding
 Life's Shadows (1916) - Rodney Thorndyke
 Greed (1917) - Richard Cole
 Motherhood (1917) - Albert
 Mrs. Balfame (1917) - Dwight Rush
 The Debt (1917)
 The Mirror (1917) - Bob Merrill
 The Dazzling Miss Davison (1917) - Gerard Buckland
 Mary Moreland (1917) - Thomas Maughm
 Thou Shalt Not Steal (1917) - Roger Benton
 The Seven Deadly Sins (1917) - Richard Coe (Greed)
 Joan of Plattsburg (1918) - Capt. Lane
 Resurrection (1918) - Prince Nekludov
 When Men Betray (1918) - Raymond Edwards
 For the Freedom of the East (1918) - Robert Kenyon
 The Spirit of Lafayette (1919) - Lieutenant Richard Stanton
 Unknown Love (1919) - Captain Jack Tims
 A Woman There Was (1919) - Pulke
 Checkers (1919) - Kendal
 L'apache (1919) - Otis Mayne
 The Empire of Diamonds (1920) - Matthew Versigny
 The Money Maniac (1921) - Didier Bouchard
 A Virgin Paradise (1921) - Bob Alan
 Lonely Heart (1921)
 Fair Lady (1922) - Norvin Blake
 Without Fear (1922) - John Miles
 A Pasteboard Crown (1922) - Stewart Thrall
 The Broken Silence (1922) - Bruce Cameron
 Man and Wife (1923) - Dr. Howard Fleming
 Obey Your Husband (1928) - Mr. Kennedy
 Happiness Ahead (1928) - Detective
 Lights of New York (1928) - Detective Crosby
 Romance of the Underworld (1928) - Edwin Burke
 The Lone Wolf's Daughter (1929) - Ethier
 Protection (1929) - Wallace Crockett
 The Valiant (1929) - Minor Role (uncredited)
 Thunderbolt (1929) - Prison Chaplain
 Hide-Out (1930) - William Burke
 The Divorcee (1930) - Bill Baldwin
 Kathleen Mavourneen (1930) - Dan Moriarity
 Sweet Mama (1930) - Mack
 Men of the North (1930) - Sergeant Mooney
 The Doorway to Hell (1930) - O'Grady
 Captain Thunder (1930) - Morgan
 The Finger Points (1931) - City Editor Frank Carter
 The Maltese Falcon (1931) - Detective Lt. Dundy
 The Star Witness (1931) - Deputy Williams (uncredited)
 Murder at Midnight (1931) - Inspector Taylor
 Five Star Final (1931) - Brannegan
 The Ruling Voice (1931) - A Reformer (uncredited)
 Behind Stone Walls (1932) - District Attorney John Manson Clay
 Midnight Patrol (1932) - Howard Brady
 White Eagle (1932) - Capt. Blake
 The Phantom of Crestwood (1932) - Police Detective
 Madison Square Garden (1932) - Honest John Miller
 Self Defense (1932) - Dan Simmons
 The Crime of the Century (1933) - Police Capt. Timothy Riley
 The Woman Who Dared (1933) - Attorney
 The Return of Casey Jones (1933) - Casey Jones
 Heroes for Sale (1933) - 'Red' Squad Policeman #1
 Twin Husbands (1933) - Sergeant Kerrigan
 Lady Killer (1933) - Brannigan
 Gambling Lady (1934) - Graves
 Looking for Trouble (1934) - Police Captain Flynn
 Port of Lost Dreams (1934) - Lt. Andersen
 Transatlantic Merry-Go-Round (1934) - Inspector 'Mac' McKinney
 The World Accuses (1934) - Lt. Ryan
 Death Flies East (1935) - Griffith (uncredited)
 Times Square Lady (1935) - 'Brick' Culver
 Circumstantial Evidence (1935) - Detective Brown (uncredited)
 Black Sheep (1935) - Detective Clancy (uncredited)
 I'd Give My Life (1936) - Powell (uncredited)
 Trade Winds (1938) - Captain George Faulkiner
 Disbarred (1939) - L.M. Curron (uncredited)
 Made for Each Other (1939) - Airport Operations Manager (uncredited)
 The Saint Strikes Back (1939) - Chief Inspector Webster
 Should a Girl Marry? (1939) - Warden
 Mickey the Kid (1939) - FBI Agent Farrow
 I Stole a Million (1939) - Peterson
 The Roaring Twenties (1939) - First Detective
 Gone with the Wind (1939) - Yankee Major
 Invisible Stripes (1939) - Arresting Officer (uncredited)
 Abe Lincoln in Illinois (1940) - Minor Role (uncredited)
 Half a Sinner (1940) - Officer Kelly
 'Til We Meet Again (1940) - Detective (uncredited)
 The Ghost Breakers (1940) - Lieutenant Murray (uncredited)
 Flowing Gold (1940) - Mac, Highway Patrolman (uncredited)
 White Eagle (1941) - Carlson (uncredited)
 Captain Tugboat Annie (1945) - Detective Franklin
 Chick Carter, Detective (1946) - Dan Rankin
 The Devil's Playground (1946) - Judge Morton (final film role)

References

External links

1879 births
1951 deaths
American male film actors
American male silent film actors
20th-century American male actors
Male actors from Columbus, Ohio